Sir Frederick Chalmers Bourne, KCSI, CIE (12 August 1891 – 3 November 1977) was an English colonial administrator who served in British India until 1947 and then in the new Dominion of Pakistan until 1950.

Early life 
Frederick Chalmers Bourne was born on 12 August 1891. He studied in Rugby and finished his master's degree in Christ Church, Oxford. His father was Frederick Samuel Augustus Bourne, a British consular official in China and later Judge of the British Supreme Court for China and Japan.

Career 
Bourne was commissioned into the British Army in 1910, and served in the Queen's Own Royal West Kent Regiment. In 1920, he joined the Indian Civil Service and held several prominent positions in the administrations of Lahore and the Punjab between 1937 and 1945.

He was appointed acting Governor of the Central Provinces and Berar from May to October 1945, and as the acting Governor of Assam in 1946.

He became the last Governor of the Central Provinces and Berar in 1946, serving until independence of India on 15 August 1947. Bourne then became the first Governor of Pakistan's East Bengal, and served until 5 April 1950.

References

External links
Sir Frederick Chalmers Bourne at the National Portrait Gallery, London
Frederick Chalmers Bourne in the National Archives

|-

1891 births
1977 deaths
Knights Commander of the Order of the Star of India
People from Kent
Alumni of Christ Church, Oxford
Governors of East Pakistan
British expatriates in Pakistan
Indian Civil Service (British India) officers
Companions of the Order of the Indian Empire
British people in colonial India